Events from the year 1614 in Germany.

Births
 Philip Dietrich, Count of Waldeck
 Emilie of Oldenburg-Delmenhorst
 Philipp Stolle
 Johann Hildebrand
 Konrad Viktor Schneider

Deaths
 Bartholomäus Scultetus (born 1540)
 Jakob Ebert (born 1549)

1610s in the Holy Roman Empire